Route 888 is a north-south regional highway in northern Israel.  It begins at Beit Tzida junction with Highway 87 and ends at Beit HaMekhes junction with Highway 91.

Junctions on the route

See also
List of highways in Israel

888